Reljan is a village located in the municipality of Preševo, Serbia. According to the 2002 census, the village has a population of 694 people. Of these, 489 (70,46 %) were ethnic Albanians, 203 (29,25 %) were Serbs, 1 (0,14 %) Russian, and 1 (0,14 %) other.

References

Populated places in Pčinja District
Albanian communities in Serbia